Lexington Township is located in McLean County, Illinois. As of the 2010 census, its population was 2,399 and it contained 1,005 housing units.

Geography

Demographics

References

External links
City-data.com
Illinois State Archives

Townships in McLean County, Illinois
Townships in Illinois